James Fisk may refer to:

 James Fisk (financier) (1835–1872)
 James Brown Fisk (1910–1981), physicist 
 James Fisk (politician) (1763–1844), U.S. Senator from Vermont
 James L. Fisk (c. 1845–1902), Union Army officer and leader of four expeditions to Montana